Beryl O Noakes (born 29 July 1942) is a British former swimmer.

Swimming career
She competed in the women's 4 × 100 metre freestyle relay at the 1960 Summer Olympics.

She represented England and won a bronze medal in the freestyle relay at the 1958 British Empire and Commonwealth Games in Cardiff, Wales.

References

1942 births
Living people
British female swimmers
Olympic swimmers of Great Britain
Swimmers at the 1960 Summer Olympics
Sportspeople from London
Commonwealth Games medallists in swimming
Commonwealth Games bronze medallists for England
Swimmers at the 1958 British Empire and Commonwealth Games
20th-century British women
Medallists at the 1958 British Empire and Commonwealth Games